Golmaal Returns is a 2008 Indian Hindi-language comedy film directed by Rohit Shetty. Based on the 1973 Hindi film Aaj Ki Taaza Khabar, it serves as the second installment in the Golmaal film series. The film stars Ajay Devgn, Arshad Warsi, Tusshar Kapoor, Kareena Kapoor and Shreyas Talpade. It was one of the highest-grossing Hindi films of 2008.

Plot
Gopal (Ajay Devgn) lives with his wife Ekta (Kareena Kapoor), who is addicted to watching Indian dramas and soap operas. He also lives with his sister Esha (Amrita Arora) and Ekta's mute brother , his brother in law Lucky (Tusshar Kapoor). Lucky is in love with a deaf girl named Daisy (Anjana Sukhani). One night, while returning from his office, Gopal saves an attractive young woman named Meera (Celina Jaitly) from some dreadful goons. Due to circumstances, both of them decide to stay the night at Gopal's friend's yacht.

When he arrives home the next day, an over-suspicious Ekta suspects Gopal of flirting around with his female employees and having an affair with his secretary. Knowing how difficult it is to convince her with the truth, he invents a story about spending the night with a fictitious friend named Anthony Gonsalves. Ekta becomes suspicious and does not believe his story as she knows that he never had a friend by that name, and hence, she decides to write to Anthony to visit her and to confirm Gopal was telling the truth.

Gopal meets Laxman Prasad (Shreyas Talpade) who has come to interview for a position in his office. He is Meera's boyfriend, which is not known to Gopal who asks him to pretend to be Anthony, and meet and convince Ekta that he was indeed telling the truth, in return for a job. Laxman agrees to do so, and everything goes according to plan until the address on which Ekta had written a letter to Anthony turns out to be real. Meanwhile, Gopal finds out that a dead body was found at the same location where he saved Meera from the goons.

Investigating Officer Madhav (Arshad Warsi), who also happens to be Esha's boyfriend, does not get along with Gopal. He finds out that Gopal was missing from his home that very night and that the dead person was Gopal's colleague whom he had threatened to kill over a spat. Madhav also finds out that Laxman is not the real Anthony. He asks Gopal to get the girl to the police station to prove that Gopal had been with her, and did not murder his employee. After three days and a lot of attempts, they still are not able to find the girl. In panic, Laxman and Lucky hire a woman called Munni (Ashwini Kalsekar) who needs money to get her boyfriend Vasooli (Mukesh Tiwari) out of jail. But Munni is kidnapped by the murderer.

In a rage, Vasooli comes to Meera's house, where Laxman and Lucky learn the woman was none other than Meera whom Gopal had saved from the goons that night. After an initial shock, they decide to go to the police station. However, Vasooli kidnaps Meera in anger. Gopal is later bailed out by Sawant (Murali Sharma) who is going along with him to the Lover's Point along with Madhav, Esha, Lucky and Laxman in tow and Ekta, Vasooli and Meera arriving later. Munni is found tied up with her mouth gagged with tape in the back of the murderer's jeep. Munni is heard moaning through the tape on her mouth. Laxman unties Munni and removes the tape from her mouth. Gopal learns that this was a plot concocted by Sawant to frame him for the murder, as his illegal drug trade was about to be exposed. The drama grows, as everyone attempts suicide (except Madhav and Lucky), much to Sawant's anger. Finally, Sawant goes crazy and tries to kill himself. Ekta and Gopal get back together, Madhav and Gopal also shake hands in the end.

Lucky, meanwhile, marries the daughter of the president of Gopal's company, who happens to be Daisy and becomes the new boss, giving a shock to the others. Gopal and Laxman are the junior bosses while Madhav is a 24-hour guard for Lucky.

Cast
 Ajay Devgn as Gopal Kumar Santoshi
 Arshad Warsi as Madhav Singh Ghai
 Kareena Kapoor as Ekta Gill Santoshi
 Tusshar Kapoor as Lucky Gill
 Shreyas Talpade as Laxman Prasad Apte / Anthony Gonsalves
 Murali Sharma as Vinay Sawant
 Amrita Arora as Esha Santoshi Ghai
 Celina Jaitly as Meera Iyer
 Ashwini Kalsekar as Munni Devi
 Anjana Sukhani as Daisy Kapoor
 Sajid Samji as Constable Pinky
 Mukesh Tiwari as Vasooli
 Sharat Saxena as Babloo Kapoor 
 Vrajesh Hirjee as Anthony Gonsalves / Aatmaram
 Rakhee Tandon as Julie Gonsalves
 Sanjay Mishra as Subodh Mehra
 Shereveer Vakil as Vinay's aide
 Robin Bhatt as Gopal's neighbor
 Upasana Singh as Lucky's customer
 Sharman Joshi as Laxman Prasad (archive footage in photo)
 Siddarth Jadhav as Lucky's assistant
 Ashish R. Mohan as Hiren
 Gulshan Sharma
 Ram Kapoor (cameo appearance)

Production
Ajay Devgn is paired opposite Kareena Kapoor. Amongst the rest of the multi-starrer cast, actress Amrita Arora is the love interest of Arshad Warsi whilst Celina Jaitly and Anjana Sukhani are paired opposite Shreyas Talpade and Tusshar Kapoor, respectively.

Originally expected to commence shooting for the film in Dubai on a forty-day schedule, the cast shot for the film in Goa on a twenty-day schedule. Shooting later continued in places like the Filmistan Studios in Mumbai, South Africa and Bangkok.

Music

The soundtrack was released on 19 September 2008 by director Rohit Shetty and actors Ajay Devgn, Tusshar Kapoor & Shreyas Talpade on the musical show Sa Re Ga Ma Pa Challenge 2009. While the film's soundtrack contains six new songs composed by Pritam for the sequel, the album also consists of songs from the first film. Lyrics have been penned by Sameer.

The music video of the song "Tha Kar Ke" cost , making it the most expensive Bollywood music video up until that time. Its choreography and picturisation was reportedly inspired by the Sivaji song "Athiradee".

Joginder Tuteja from IndiaFM gave the film's soundtrack 3 out of 5 stars and noted, that "Golmaal Returns is yet another winner from Pritam who delivers what is expected from a soundtrack for a film belonging to action-comedy genre. No one attempts to do anything exceptional or different from routine but walk the path which has been successful in the months gone by. The music may not go the Race (2008) way but does well enough to ensure immense awareness about the film due to its fast paced approach." According to the Indian trade website Box Office India, with around 14,00,000 units sold, this film's soundtrack album was the year's tenth highest-selling.

Release

Box office
Golmaal Returns was considered financially successful. It grossed between 420–450 million in the first five days.

Home media
The film was released on DVD on 10 December 2010. The release included a single disc edition with the film and special features being the making of the film, and three songs: "Golmaal Remix", "Meeoow", and "Tu Saala".
On the Moser Baer release, it is one disc plus a bonus disc of Golmaal starring Ajay Devgn, Sharman Joshi, Tusshar Kapoor, Rimi Sen and Paresh Rawal.

Controversies
In 2008, Shakuntala Bhatia, wife of director Rajendra Bhatia filed a complaint against Shree Asthavinayak Cine Vision Ltd., accusing them of directly copying the story of her husband's film Aaj Ki Taaza Khabar (1973).

Sequel

A sequel Golmaal 3 was released in 2010.

References

External links
 
 
 

2008 films
2000s Hindi-language films
2000s buddy comedy films
2008 comedy-drama films
Films directed by Rohit Shetty
Films featuring songs by Pritam
Cross-dressing in Indian films
Films shot in Goa
Films set in Goa
Indian buddy comedy films
Indian comedy-drama films
Indian sequel films
Remakes of Indian films